The 1974–75 Clarks Men's Shoes National Basketball League season was the third season of the recently formulated National Basketball League.

The league was sponsored by Clarks Men's Shoes and the number of teams increased again from eight to ten. Three new teams appeared in the form of Coventry Granwood, Exeter St Lukes and Cleveland StrongArm but Liverpool did not take part. The Islington Embassy All-Stars team (devoid of the London Latvian merger) completed the double of National League and Cup. There were no playoffs for the League during this era.

League standings

Clarks Men's Shoes National Cup Final

Leading scorers

See also
Basketball in England
British Basketball League
English Basketball League
List of English National Basketball League seasons

References

 
British
National Basketball League (England) seasons